Şahin Şenoduncu (born 24 April 1994) is a Turkish racewalking athlete.

At the 2019 Balkan Race Walking Championship held in Alexandroupoli, Greece, Şenoduncu won the silver medal. He became champion at the 2021 Balkan Race Walking Championship in Antalya, Turkey. Representing Turkey at the 2020 Summer Olympics , he placed 34th in 20 km walk.

References

External links

1994 births
Living people
People from Ayvalık
Sportspeople from Balıkesir
Turkish male racewalkers
Athletes (track and field) at the 2020 Summer Olympics
Olympic athletes of Turkey
Olympic male racewalkers
21st-century Turkish people